Adventures was an American rock band from Pittsburgh, Pennsylvania. It was formed in 2012 by three members of the hardcore punk band Code Orange – Joe Goldman, Reba Meyers and Jami Morgan – with their friends Kimi Hanauer and Dominic Landolina (now also a member of Code Orange). They were initially signed to No Sleep Records, but later transferred to Run for Cover Records. 

Adventures have released four EPs, followed by the 2015 studio album Supersonic Home.

History

In May 2014, the band embarked on a tour with Seahaven and Foxing.

On March 5, 2015, the band played Hostage Calm's final show at Toad's Place in New Haven, CT alongside TWIABP, Superheaven, and Sorority Noise. In April, the band embarked on a US tour supporting Whirr. On April 7, 2015, the band played their Supersonic Home record release show at Roboto in Pittsburgh, PA with support from Whirr, Give, Run Forever, and Swingers Club. In August, the band played Wrecking Ball Fest in Atlanta, GA. Following this, the band embarked on a US tour supporting Basement alongside LVL UP and Palehound.

In 2016, the band implied their break-up by tweeting the emojis of a sad face, a gun, and a peace sign.

Members
 Joe Goldman – bass, backing vocals (2012–2016)
 Kimi Hanauer – keyboards, backing vocals (2012–2016)
 Dominic Landolina – guitar (2012–2016)
 Reba Meyers – lead vocals, guitar (2012–2016)
 Jami Morgan – drums (2012–2016)

Discography

Studio albums
Supersonic Home (Run for Cover Records, 2015)

EPs
Adventures (No Sleep Records, 2012)
Clear My Head with You (No Sleep Records, 2013)

Splits
Adventures / Run, Forever (No Sleep Records, 2014)
Adventures / Pity Sex (Run for Cover Records, 2014)

References

External links 

 
Adventures on Bandcamp

Emo revival groups
Alternative rock groups from Pennsylvania
Indie rock musical groups from Pennsylvania
Musical groups from Pittsburgh
2012 establishments in Pennsylvania
Musical groups established in 2012
Run for Cover Records artists
Musical quintets
Code Orange (band)
No Sleep Records artists